The 2015 FIVB Beach Volleyball World Championships were staged from 26 June to 5 July 2015 in The Hague, Amsterdam, Rotterdam, and Apeldoorn, Netherlands. The FIVB Beach Volleyball World Championships are organized every two years and Netherlands hosted the event for the first time. 48 teams per gender entered the competition making 96 total. The winners of the event qualified for the 2016 Summer Olympics.

Venues

Medal summary

Medal table

Medal events

References

External links
Official website

 
Beach Volleyball World Championships
World Championships
Beach Volleyball World Championships
International volleyball competitions hosted by the Netherlands
Beach Volleyball World Championships
Beach Volleyball World Championships
Beach volleyball in the Netherlands